is a Japanese speed skater. She competed at the 1992, 1994 and the 1998 Winter Olympics.

References

1972 births
Living people
Japanese female speed skaters
Olympic speed skaters of Japan
Speed skaters at the 1992 Winter Olympics
Speed skaters at the 1994 Winter Olympics
Speed skaters at the 1998 Winter Olympics
Sportspeople from Hokkaido
Speed skaters at the 1990 Asian Winter Games
Medalists at the 1990 Asian Winter Games
Asian Games medalists in speed skating
Asian Games silver medalists for Japan
20th-century Japanese women
21st-century Japanese women